Zihlbrücke railway station is a railway station in the municipality of Gampelen, in the Swiss canton of Bern. It is an intermediate stop on the standard gauge Bern–Neuchâtel line of BLS AG. The station takes its name from the river Thielle which the railway line crosses into the Canton of Neuchâtel immediately to the west.

Services 
The following services stop at Zihlbrücke:

References

External links 
 
 

Railway stations in the canton of Bern
BLS railway stations